The 1985 European Junior Swimming Championships were held from July 25 to July 28, 1985, in Geneva, Switzerland.

Medal table

Medal summary

Boy's events

|-
| 100 m freestyle

|-
| 200 m freestyle

|-
| 400 m freestyle

|-
| 1500 m freestyle

|-
| 100 m backstroke

|-
| 200 m backstroke

|-
| 100 m breaststroke

|-
| 200 m breaststroke

|-
| 100 m butterfly

|-
| 200 m butterfly

|-
| 200 m individual medley

|-
| 400 m individual medley

|-
| 4 × 100 m freestyle relay

|-
| 4 × 200 m freestyle relay

|-
| 4 × 100 m medley relay

|}

Girl's events

|-
| 100 m freestyle

|-
| 200 m freestyle

|-
| 400 m freestyle

|-
| 800 m freestyle

|-
| 100 m backstroke

|-
| 200 m backstroke

|-
| 100 m breaststroke

|-
| 200 m breaststroke

|-
| 100 m butterfly

|-
| 200 m butterfly

|-
| 200 m individual medley

|-
| 400 m individual medley

|-
| 4 × 100 m freestyle relay

|-
| 4 × 200 m freestyle relay

|-
| 4 × 100 m medley relay

|}

J
S
European Junior Swimming Championships
S
Swimming competitions in Switzerland
Swimming
Sports competitions in Geneva
July 1985 sports events in Europe